Cassel may refer to:

People
 Cassel (surname)

Places
France
 Cassel, Nord, a town and commune in northern France
 Battle of Cassel (1071)
 Battle of Cassel (1328)
 Battle of Cassel (1677)
Germany
 Cassel, Germany, a city in Hesse renamed Kassel in 1926
 Siege of Cassel (1762)
South Africa
 Cassel, Northern Cape
United States
 Cassel, California, a town
 Cassel, Wisconsin, a town
 New Cassel, New York, a hamlet

See also
Casel (disambiguation)
Cassell (disambiguation)
Cassells
Cassels